"Sailing" is a 1979 soft rock song written and recorded by American artist Christopher Cross. It was released in June 1980 as the second single from his debut album Christopher Cross (1979), which was already certified Gold by this time. The song was a success in the United States, reaching number one on the Billboard Hot 100 chart on August 30, 1980, where it stayed for one week. The song also won Grammy Awards for Record of the Year, Song of the Year, and Arrangement of the Year, and helped Cross win the Best New Artist award. VH1 named "Sailing" the most "softsational soft rock" song of all time.

The song was recorded in 1979, utilizing the 3M Digital Recording System, making it one of the first digitally recorded songs to chart. In his Grammy acceptance speech, Cross acknowledged "Sailing" as his favorite song on the album and that originally it was not meant to be a single. The song was later identified as an archetype of the style that later became known as yacht rock (Cross and similar artists referred to the style as the West Coast sound at the time).

"Sailing" was sampled on "Bagsy Not In Net" by The 1975 from their album Notes On A Conditional Form.

Background
Cross has said in interviews that the song's inspiration was his friendship with an older friend from his high school, Al Glasscock, who would take him sailing as a teenager, just to get away from the trials and tribulations of being a teenager.  Glasscock functioned as a surrogate older brother during a tough time for Cross emotionally.  Although Cross lost touch with Glasscock, The Howard Stern Show in April 1995 reunited the two after 28 years.  Cross acknowledged on the show that his sailing trips with Glasscock had been the inspiration for the song.  After that reunion, Cross sent Glasscock a copy of the platinum record he earned for selling more than five million copies of "Sailing."

Personnel
Christopher Cross – voices,  12 strings electric guitar and arrangements
Andy Salmon – bass
Michael Omartian – acoustic piano and arrangements
Rob Meurer – electric piano and arrangements
Victor Feldman  – percussions
 Tommy Taylor – drums

Charts

Year-end charts

See also
List of Billboard Hot 100 number-one singles of 1980

References

External links
The 45 version of "Sailing" on YouTube
Lyric Video

Songs about boats
Songs about oceans and seas
1979 songs
1980 singles
Christopher Cross songs
Billboard Hot 100 number-one singles
Cashbox number-one singles
Grammy Award for Record of the Year
Grammy Award for Song of the Year
RPM Top Singles number-one singles
Songs written by Christopher Cross
Song recordings produced by Michael Omartian
Grammy Award for Best Instrumental Arrangement Accompanying Vocalist(s)
1970s ballads
Warner Records singles
Rock ballads